Davide Ugo Capello (born 27 September 1984) is a former Italian professional footballer who played as a goalkeeper.

Club career
Born in Nuoro, Sardinia, Capello started his career at Sardinian side Cagliari. During the 2002–03 season, due to the suspension of Armando Pantanelli, he played as Paolo Mancini's backup on 26 January 2003 against Venezia. He won promotion to Serie A as Serie B Runner-up in 2004. He was the third keeper behind Gennaro Iezzo and Fanis Katergiannakis in 2004–05 Serie A season. In January 2005, he left for Belluno in exchange with Luca Tomasig. In August 2005, he left for Olbia in co-ownership deal. In January 2007, he left for Nuorese. In the 2008–09 season, he played for Alghero and in the 2009–10 season he played for Serie D side Budoni.

In July 2013 he joined Savona as goalkeeping coach, however he also played once for the first team. In December 2013 he returned to Sardinia.

International career
In 2004, Capello was called up to the Italy U20 team (U21 feeder team) and played 3 times. In 2005, he was called to Italy U21 B team specially for 2005 Mediterranean Games, for a preparation match against Serie D Best XI. He played his only match with the team against Morocco.

Personal life
After retirement in December 2013, Capello started work as a firefighter.

Capello was one of the survivors of Ponte Morandi bridge collapsing on 14 August 2018; his car fell , but he managed to walk away unscathed.

References

External links
 Profile at AIC.Football.it 
 
 Profile at FIGC 

Italian footballers
Cagliari Calcio players
A.C. Belluno 1905 players
Olbia Calcio 1905 players
Nuorese Calcio players
Savona F.B.C. players
Italy youth international footballers
Serie B players
Serie C players
Association football goalkeepers
People from Nuoro
1984 births
Living people
Footballers from Sardinia
Fall survivors
Pol. Alghero players
Competitors at the 2005 Mediterranean Games
Mediterranean Games competitors for Italy